Ellen Van Volkenburg (October 8, 1882 – December 15, 1978), born Nellie Van Volkenburg in Battle Creek, Michigan, was a leading actress, director, puppeteer and theater educator in the United States and the UK. Educated at the University of Michigan, Van Volkenburg has been credited, along with her then-husband Englishman Maurice Browne, with being the founder of the Little Theatre Movement in America through their work with the Chicago Little Theatre. Van Volkenburg and Browne went on to found the department of drama at the Cornish School in Seattle in 1918, now Cornish College of the Arts. Although she divorced Maurice Browne in 1922, for much of her life she signed herself "Ellen Van Volkenburg Browne."

References

People from Battle Creek, Michigan
1882 births
1978 deaths
University of Michigan alumni